Jermaine Gonzales (born 26 November 1984) is a Jamaican 400 metres runner. He is currently being coached by Glen Mills and Bertland Cameron.

He had a successful start to international athletics in the young age categories, taking the 400 m bronze at the 2001 World Youth Championships in Athletics and stepping up a level for another bronze at the 2002 World Junior Championships in Athletics. He missed large parts of the 2003 and 2004 seasons due to injury. He competed at the 2004 Summer Olympics with the Jamaican 4x400 metre relay team, which was disqualified. He won his first senior medal at the 2006 Commonwealth Games with a new personal best time of 45.16 seconds.

He improved his personal best to 44.79 seconds with a win at a meeting in June in Sotteville-lès-Rouen – the first time he had run under 45 seconds since 2006. The following month he broke Roxbert Martin's Jamaican record to win the Herculis Diamond League meeting with a time of 44.40 seconds—setting a world-leading mark.

References

External links 
 

1984 births
Living people
People from Saint Catherine Parish
Jamaican male sprinters
Athletes (track and field) at the 2004 Summer Olympics
Athletes (track and field) at the 2006 Commonwealth Games
Athletes (track and field) at the 2012 Summer Olympics
Commonwealth Games bronze medallists for Jamaica
Olympic athletes of Jamaica
World Athletics Championships medalists
Commonwealth Games medallists in athletics
Medallists at the 2006 Commonwealth Games